Edward Staudenmayer is an American musical theater actor and singer. He is known for his roles as Vlad in the first national tour of Anastasia, Monsieur Gilles André in The Phantom of the Opera national tour, and a performer in Forbidden Broadway Cleans Up Its Act.

Education and career

Education 
Edward Staudenmayer was born and raised in California. He was involved in his high school's theater program and performed in The Music Man. He received a scholar ship to attend University of California, Los Angeles to study musical theater. While in college, he won the Carol Burnett Award.

Off-Broadway career 
Staudenmayer made his Off-Broadway debut as a performer in the 1998 production of Forbidden Broadway Cleans Up Its Act. He can be heard in the original cast recording published in 1999 for this musical. That same year, he played Kevin Bursteter in the Off-Broadway production of Exactly Like You.

Broadway career 
In 2006, Staudenmayer made his Broadway debut as an understudy in Martin Short: Fame Becomes Me. Five years later, he played the White Rabbit in the Broadway production of Wonderland.

National-tour career 
In 2013, Staudenmayer joined the national tour of The Phantom of the Opera as Monsieur Gilles André. When he first saw the musical in junior high, Monsieur André was his favorite character, and Staudenmayer wanted to play him in the future. Two and a half years later, Staudenmayer took a short break from the tour but returned to play Monsieur André again.

Most recently, Staudenmayer played Vlad in the first national tour of Anastasia. His run as Vlad, which began in 2018, ended in March 2020, when all remaining performances of the first national tour were cancelled due to the COVID-19 pandemic.

Performance credits

References 

Living people
American male musical theatre actors
Singers from California
University of California, Los Angeles alumni
Year of birth missing (living people)